Blair St. Clair (born May 16, 1995) is an American drag queen, singer, and hair stylist, known for competing on the tenth season of the reality competition series RuPaul's Drag Race, as well as the fifth season of RuPaul's Drag Race All Stars.

Her debut album Call My Life, which was released in June 2018, reached number one on the Billboard Dance/Electronic Sales Chart. It spawned two singles - "Now or Never" and "Call My Life", which reached the top ten on the Dance chart. The follow-up album, Identity, was released in July 2020. It was preceded by singles "Empty" and "9 Lives".

Early life 
St. Clair was born to Peggy Bryson in Indiana on May 16, 1995. She attended Perry Meridian High School in Indianapolis where she participated in theater.

Career 

St. Clair first rose to prominence when she won the title of Miss Gay Indiana in 2016. She was revealed as one of fourteen contestants on the tenth season of RuPaul's Drag Race before the official cast was announced due to getting arrested for a DUI violation. She is the first contestant from Indiana to compete on the show. She was the sixth contestant eliminated on a lipsync to Diana Ross' "I'm Coming Out", losing to The Vixen, and placing ninth.

St. Clair's grand finale dress was designed by Project Runway alumnus Mondo Guerra. After the show, she walked for Guerra's collection at FashioNXT in October 2018. In late 2019, St. Clair launched Hair by Blair with the intent to sell lace front and full lace wigs online; and, shortly after moving back to Indianapolis, St. Clair opened a full-service salon under the same name to take in clients.

Music
One day after her elimination episode, St. Clair released her debut single, "Now or Never", on April 27, 2018. The song's music video features Jinkx Monsoon, Manila Luzon, and Max Emerson.

St. Clair released a follow-up single, "Call My Life", with a music video on June 26, 2018. Her seven-track debut album of the same name was released three days later. Drag Race alumna Alaska is featured on the album's sixth track, "America's Sweetheart". The album peaked at number one of the Billboard Dance/Electronic Sales Chart. A remix EP of the "Call My Life" single was released on August 10, 2018. It features Dave Audé, Chris Cox, DrewG., Hector Fonseca, Zambianco and Ralphi Rosario. She released her third single, "Irresistible" with a music video on October 25, 2018. Blair St. Clair released her single "Easy Love" on July 12, 2019. On April 30, 2020 Blair released her single "Empty", followed by "9 Lives" and six promotional singles from her second studio album Identity, released on July 21, 2020.

Personal life 

The first part of St. Clair's drag name came from the character Blair in Gossip Girl while the second part was suggested by her mother after she had passed St. Clair Street in downtown Indianapolis. St. Clair has mentioned using the name Blair and female pronouns in her personal life.

St. Clair was raped at a college party, which she shared on RuPaul's Drag Race. In 2018, Drag Race winner Bianca Del Rio controversially made a joke at one of her comedy sets about St. Clair's decision to bring up the rape on Drag Race upon finding out she was up for elimination. Del Rio received backlash from fans and fellow queens including St. Clair herself. In November 2019, fellow drag queen Trinity The Tuck brought Blair onto her podcast and encouraged her to speak with Bianca about said joke.

Filmography

Television

Web series

Music videos

Discography

Studio albums

Remix albums

Singles
As lead artist

As featured artist

Promotional singles

Other appearances

Notes

References

External links 

 
 

1995 births
Living people
20th-century American LGBT people
21st-century American singers
21st-century American LGBT people
American drag queens
American gay musicians
American LGBT singers
Gay entertainers
LGBT Christians
LGBT people from Indiana
People from Indianapolis
Blair St. Clair
Blair St. Clair